Major-General Percy Ryan Conway Commings  (1880–1958) was a British Army officer.

Military career
Commings was commissioned into the Queen's Royal Regiment (West Surrey) on 7 May 1898. He saw action during the First World War for which he was appointed a Companion of the Distinguished Service Order. He went on to become commander of the Rangoon Brigade in June 1931 and General Officer Commanding 56th (London) Infantry Division in June 1934 before retiring in June 1938.

He was colonel of the South Staffordshire Regiment from 1935 to 1946.

Family
He married Emily Maude Frederica Wilson; they had a son and two daughters.

References

1880 births
1958 deaths
British Army major generals
Companions of the Order of the Bath
Companions of the Order of St Michael and St George
Companions of the Distinguished Service Order
Queen's Royal Regiment officers
British Army personnel of World War I